Scaevola argentea, is a low growing, branching shrub in the family Goodeniaceae.

Description
Scaevola argentea, is a prostrate, branching shrub which grows to a height of to 15 cm. It is silvery and hairy.  The leaves are sessile, elliptic to obovate, sometimes dentate, sometimes entire. The leaf blade is about 8–20 mm long and 3–13 mm wide. The flowers occur in dense spikes or spike-like thyrses and have elliptical bracts which are 5–10 mm long and  entire. The bracteoles are 3–4 mm long and narrowly elliptic. The sepals are free. The corolla is 8–13 mm long, and has silvery hairs on the outside, is bearded inside, and is mauve to blue. The ovary is 2-locular. The indusium (cup enclosing the stigma) is  1 mm long and has a stiff purplish beard with and without  bristles on the lips. The fruit is about 2 mm long, ellipsoidal, sometimes ribbed, otherwise smooth, sometimes pubescent.

It has no synonyms.

Distribution & habitat
Scaevola argentea is endemic to Western Australia and found between Ravensthorpe and Ongerup. It grows in sandy heaths.

Etymology
The specific epithet, argentea, is derived from the Latin, argenteus,-a,-um ,  which means silver, silvery, silvery-white.

References

External links
 Scaevola argentea: Occurrence data from the Australasian Virtual Herbarium

argentea
Eudicots of Western Australia
Asterales of Australia
Plants described in 1992
Taxa named by Roger Charles Carolin